Alain Supiot FBA (born 5 June 1949 in Nantes) is a French legal scholar.

Biography
Supiot achieved his licentiate in law in 1970 and in sociology in 1972, and finished his Ph.D. in law from the University of Bordeaux 1 France, in 1979. Professor tenure (1980), member of the « Institut Universitaire de France » (2001, chair of « Dogmatic Grounds of Law and Social Ties »), Ph.D. honoris causa (Université catholique de Louvain, Belgium), Alain Supiot has successively been Professor at the University of Poitiers and Nantes, France (UMR-CNRS 6028). He created in Nantes the « Maison des sciences de l’Homme Ange Guépin » (Institute for Humanities and Social Sciences), and more recently the Nantes Institute for Advanced Study Foundation, which is promoting cooperations between the North and the South in the field of Social Sciences. He was elected  to Collège de France on chair «État social et mondialisation : analyse juridique des solidarités»
His career has been landmarked by several years spent in foreign Universities and Research Institutes (Institute of Industrial Relations, Berkeley, USA, 1981 ; Florence University Institute, Italy, 1989–1990 ; Wissenschaftskolleg zu Berlin, Germany, 1997–1998). Member of the  « Droit social » law review, he also authored numerous books focussing on labor law and social security law (among others : Critique du droit du travail, PUF, 1994) and participated to various collective works (among others : Le travail en perspective, LGDJ, 1998 ; Servir l’intérêt général, PUF, 2000 ; Beyond Employment. Changes in Work and the Future of Labour Law in Europe  Oxford University Press, 2001, 245 p.). He has presided at the National Council for the Development of Human and Social Sciences (whose works have been published at PUF, Quadrige collection, 2001, under the title : « Pour une politique des sciences de l’Homme et de la société »). He seats at the scientific committee of the International Labour Review and at the administrative board of the Foundation « Maison des Sciences de l’Homme de Paris ». His actual research interests focus of the analysis of the dogmatic foundations of social ties.
His last published book in English is "The Spirit of Philadelphia. Social Justice vs. the Total Market"
He was elected as corresponding fellow to the British Academy in 2015. He is a member of the Global Commission on the Future of Work formed by International Labour Organization

Main works published in English

Main articles (in English) 

 (abridged version of the inaugural lecture at the college de France, english full text)

 

 (reprinted in 40th anniversary issue )

See also
Work, Law, and Social Linkages,
International Labor Organisation "Voices on Social Justice"
Personal page at Nantes IAS site
Personal page at College de France site

Videos
 YouTube Alain Supiot - La gouvernance par les nombres – Fondation Hugot du Collège de France  (English subtitles available)

References

French jurists
Living people
1949 births
Corresponding Fellows of the British Academy